Ragnvald Pedersson Einbu (January 10, 1870 – July 4, 1943) was a Norwegian woodcarver and painter.

Einbu was born in Lesja, the son of Peder Johannesson Einbu and Marit Syversdotter Enebo. He was the brother of astronomer Sigurd Einbu (1866–1946).  In 1915 he married Berta Marie Martinusdatter (1888–1974).

Einbu is known principally for having decorated church interiors in several places in Norway and for a wide range of decoration tasks in public buildings and private homes. In 1896, he  attended the Norwegian National Academy of Craft and Art Industry. He subsequently came in contact with Anders Sandvig at Maihaugen and   worked with the decorations in connection with the restoration of the Isum Chapel (Isum kapell) from Sør-Fron which was completed in 1910.  
Einbu died in Lesja.

Selected works
Fåberg Church: altar carvings restoration, (1931–1932)
Hov Church in Søndre Land: pulpit canopy 
Kvam Church: altar carving  restoration (1923)
Kvikne Church: pew box painting, (1922)
Lesja Church: gallery painting, pew box painting, ceiling painting (1925, 1931, and 1936)
Ringebu Stave Church: wall paintings, 1921
 Vingelen Church in Hedmark : interior, picture frames, (1925–1926)

References

Other sources
Tor Nørstegård (2008) Ragnvald Einbu  multikunstner og bestefar (Snøhetta Forlag A/S) 

1870 births
1943 deaths
20th-century Norwegian painters
Norwegian woodcarvers
People from Oppland
People from Lesja